
Year 443 BC was a year of the pre-Julian Roman calendar. At the time, it was known as the Year of the Consulship of Macerinus and Barbatus (or, less frequently, year 311 Ab urbe condita). The denomination 443 BC for this year has been used since the early medieval period, when the Anno Domini calendar era became the prevalent method in Europe for naming years.

Events 
 By place 
 Roman Republic 
 No consuls are elected in Rome, but rather military tribunes with consular power are appointed in their stead. While only patricians could be consuls, some military tribunes were plebeians. These positions had responsibility for the census, a vital function in the financial administration of Rome. So to stop the plebeians from possibly gaining control of the census, the patricians remove from the consuls and tribunes the right to take the census, and rather entrust it to two magistrates, called censores who were to be chosen exclusively from the patricians in Rome.

 Italy 
 Pericles founds the colony of Thurii near the site of the former city of Sybaris, in southern Italy. Its colonists include Herodotus and Lysias.

Births

Deaths 
 Duke Ligong of Qin, 22nd ruler of the Zhou Dynasty
 Pindar, Greek poet (b. 522 BC)

References